Benito Rebolledo Correa (August 2, 1880 – June 29, 1964) was a Chilean painter. He won the National Prize of Art of Chile in 1959.

References

1880 births
1964 deaths
People from Curicó
University of Chile alumni
Chilean male painters
19th-century Chilean painters
19th-century Chilean male artists
Chilean male artists
20th-century Chilean painters
Male painters
20th-century Chilean male artists